The Kansas Senate is the upper house of the Kansas Legislature, the state legislature of the U.S. State of Kansas. It is composed of 40 senators elected from single-member districts, each with a population of at least 60,000 inhabitants. Members of the Senate are elected to a four-year term. There is no limit to the number of terms that a senator may serve. The Kansas Senate meets at the Kansas State Capitol in Topeka.

Like other upper houses of state and territorial legislatures and the federal U.S. Senate, the Senate is reserved with special functions such as confirming or rejecting gubernatorial appointments to executive departments, the state cabinet, commissions and boards.

History
The Kansas Senate was created by the Kansas Constitution when Kansas became the 34th state of United States on January 29, 1861. Six days after its admission into the Union, the Confederate States of America formed between seven Southern states that had seceded from the United States in the previous months, leading to the American Civil War.

War bonds became a central political issue in Kansas shortly when the Kansas Senate held impeachment trials in 1862, brought about in part by United States Republican Party infighting.  The Kansas Senate voted narrowly to convict Kansas Secretary of State J. W. Robinson, and State Auditor George S. Hillyer over what they believed to be the unlawful sale of state bonds. With little evidence of a conspiracy and the smaller role of Governor Charles L. Robinson, his impeachment trial ended with only three state senators voting to convict him.

The state legislature met in a building known as the Old Constitutional Hall until their offices were moved to the east wing of the Kansas State Capitol in 1869, which was still undergoing construction. The Kansas Senate first met there in 1870, though the east wing was not completed until 1873. Work would continue on the building until March 24, 1903.

Prohibitionist, Progressive and Populist movements rose in Kansas in the late 19th century. On February 19, 1881, Kansas became the first state to amend its constitution to prohibit alcoholic beverages. After 1890, prohibition was joined with progressivism to create a reform movement. The Populist Party won the governor's office and control of the Kansas Senate in 1892. Although they did not gain control of the Kansas House of Representatives, the Populists went ahead and claimed it, alleging election fraud. This led to a legislative war between the two parties and eventually ended with a Kansas Supreme Court decision against the Populist faction of the Kansas House.

The Kansas Senate helped enact a law in 1905 to restrict children under 14 from working in factories, meatpacking houses, or mines.

With the help of progressive state senators, women gained the right to vote through a constitutional amendment approved by Kansans on November 5, 1912.

The Kansas Democratic Party only gained control of the Kansas Senate briefly in the early 1900s and haven't held it since 1917.

Since 1966, the Kansas Legislature holds annual general sessions. A constitutional amendment adopted at the 1974 general election extended the duration of the session held in the even-numbered years from 60 to 90 calendar days, subject to extension by a vote of two-thirds of the elected membership of each house.

In the 2000s the Kansas Democratic Party was able to win statewide offices and make gains in the Kansas Senate by benefiting from tension in the Kansas Republican Party between its conservative and moderate wings. These gains, however, were erased in the 2010 Kansas elections.

Legislative procedure
Terms begin and the legislature commences on the second Monday in January following the general election. Senators introduce a proposed law in the Senate in the form of a bill, which must be approved by a standing committee, the Committee of the Whole and the entire membership of the chamber. Bills are subject to amendment by other senators in committee or on the floor of the chamber.

A bill must be approved by both houses of the Kansas Legislature in order to be submitted to the governor, who can sign it into law or veto the bill. Legislators can override a veto with the support of two-thirds majority of both houses.

Leadership
The President of the Senate presides over the body, is a member of the Organization, Calendar and Rules Committee that appoints members to the remaining Kansas Senate committees and joint committees and has the power to create other committees and subcommittees. Unlike many other states, the Lieutenant Governor of Kansas does not preside over the state senate. Since a 1972 amendment to the Kansas Constitution, the lieutenant governor's duties have been severed from the legislative branch, and is active in other areas of the Kansas state government such as commissions on military affairs and health insurance. In the senate president's absence, the senate vice-president presides. The President of the Kansas Senate assigns proposed bills to committees and the majority leader determines the calendar and order of bills to be debated on the floor of the Kansas Senate. The Organization, Rules and Calendar Committee is made up of the President, Vice-President, Majority leader, Assistant Majority Leader, Minority Leader and four senators elected by the majority caucus.

The current President of the Senate is Republican Ty Masterson of District 16 (Wichita). The Senate Majority Leader is Larry Alley of District 32 (Winfield). The Senate Minority Leader is Democrat Dinah Sykes of District 21 (Lenexa).

Party composition

Officers

List of current senators

Past composition of the Senate

See also
 List of Kansas state legislatures

References

External links
 
 Interactive Map of Kansas House and Senate Districts
 State Senate of Kansas at Project Vote Smart
 
 Kansas Oral History Project

Kansas Legislature
State upper houses in the United States